Bad taste may refer to:

 An idea that does not fall within normal social standards; see the section on Bad taste in sociology
 Kitsch art
 An unpleasant flavor
 Bad Taste, the 1987 New Zealand cult film by Peter Jackson
 Bad Taste (record label), an Icelandic record label
 Bad Taste Records, a Swedish record label
 Bad Taste (album), a 2000 album by the Killer Barbies

See also 
 Bad taste in one's mouth (wiktionary)